Anavilasam  is a village in Idukki district in the Indian state of Kerala.

Demographics
As of 2011 Census, Anavilasam had a population of 7,549 with 3,730 males and 3,819 females. In Anavilasam, 8.6% of the population was under 6 years of age. Anavilasam had an average literacy of 87% higher than the national average of 74% and lower than state average of 94%; male literacy was 91% and female literacy was 83.2%.

References

Villages in Idukki district